Orford is a township municipality of about 5,000 people in Memphrémagog Regional County Municipality in the Estrie region of Quebec, Canada.

Orford's main attraction is its ski resort on Mount Orford, attracting thousands of people every winter.

Orford is well known for the Mont-Orford National Park. The park has thousands of acres of forest and two major lakes, Stukley and Fraser. Cherry river runs through the park and ends up in Lake Memphremagog. The township has many lakes and is a tourist destination in Quebec.

History
A region still little frequented at the beginning of the 19th century, the township of Orford was proclaimed in 1801 on the lands of the county of Buckinghamshire. The name refers to a village in the county of Suffolk, England. In 1855, the municipality of the township of Orford was created. Its initial development was ensured by loyalist immigration. This founded the village of Cherry River, north of Magog. Nevertheless, the rest of the municipality remains mostly wild, until the advent of the project to create a national park.

The Mont-Orford National Park, which was created in 1938, was allocated nearly half of the territory. Cherry River then becomes the gateway to the park. The creation of a ski resort and a golf course created a tourist craze for the region. Today, the population is divided between 40% permanent residents and 60% vacationers.

Demographics 

Population trend:

ADJ = adjusted figure due to boundary change.

Mother tongue (2021)

See also 
 List of township municipalities in Quebec

References

External links

Township municipalities in Quebec
Incorporated places in Estrie